Syarhyey Ryhoravich Hyerasimets (13 October 1965 – 26 September 2021) was a Belarusian professional football coach and player.

Career
As a player, he made his professional debut in the Soviet Second League in 1984 for FC Dynamo Irpen. He was perhaps best known for scoring the only goal in a 1–0 win for Belarus over the Netherlands in a Euro 1996 qualifying match in 1995.

International goals
Scores and results list Belarus' goal tally first, score column indicates score after each Herasimets goal.

Personal life
His son is Ukrainian footballer Serhiy Herasymets, who as of 2017 plays for Ukrainian First League club MFC Mykolaiv.

Honours
Dinamo Minsk
 Belarusian Premier League: 1992, 1992–93, 1993–94
 Belarusian Cup winner: 1992, 1993–94

Zenit Saint Petersburg
 Russian Cup: 1998–99

Žalgiris Kaunas
 A Lyga: 1999

Individual
 Belarusian Footballer of the Year: 1993

References

External links
 

1965 births
2021 deaths
Footballers from Kyiv
Belarusian people of Ukrainian descent
Soviet footballers
Ukrainian footballers
Belarusian footballers
Association football forwards
Belarus international footballers
Belarusian expatriate footballers
Expatriate footballers in Israel
Expatriate footballers in Russia
Expatriate footballers in Lithuania
Belarusian expatriate sportspeople in Israel
Belarusian expatriate sportspeople in Lithuania
Russian Premier League players
FC Ros Bila Tserkva players
FC Shakhtar Donetsk players
FC Dinamo Minsk players
Soviet Top League players
Belarusian Premier League players
Bnei Yehuda Tel Aviv F.C. players
FC Baltika Kaliningrad players
FC Zenit Saint Petersburg players
FC Dynamo Saint Petersburg players
FBK Kaunas footballers
FC Torpedo Minsk players
Belarusian football managers
Expatriate football managers in Russia
Expatriate football managers in Kazakhstan
FC Okzhetpes managers